WSTS is an American radio station broadcasting a southern gospel format.

WSTS may also stand for:

 Well-structured transition system in computer science.
 Wyoming State Training School, former facility of Wyoming Department of Health

See also
WST (disambiguation)